List of Filipino actresses is a list of present and past notable Filipino actresses on stage, television, and motion pictures, arranged in alphabetical order by first name.

A

Ai-Ai delas Alas (born 1964)
Aicelle Santos (born 1985)
Aiko Climaco (born 1989)
Aiko Melendez (born 1975)
Aira Bermudez (born 1983)
Akiko Solon (born 1994)
Aleck Bovick (born 1981)
Alessandra De Rossi (born 1984)
Alex Gonzaga (born 1988)
Alexa Ilacad (born 2000)
Alice Dixson (born 1969)
Alicia Alonzo (born 1946)
Alicia Mayer (born 1976)
Alicia Vergel (1927–1993)
Alma Bella (1910–2012)
Alma Moreno (born 1959)
Alodia Gosiengfiao (born 1988)
Alona Alegre (1948–2018)
Alyssa Alano (born 1987)
Ama Quiambao (1947–2013)
Amalia Fuentes (1940–2019)
Amy Austria (born 1961)
Amy Perez (born 1969)
Ana Capri (born 1977)
Ana Roces (born 1976)
Analyn Barro (born 1996)
Andi Eigenmann (born 1990)
Andrea Brillantes (born 2003)
Andrea del Rosario (born 1977)
Andrea Torres (born 1990)
Angel Aquino (born 1973)
Angel Guardian (born 1998)
Angel Locsin (born 1985)
Angeli Bayani
Angeli Gonzales (born 1994)
Angeli Nicole Sanoy (born 2001)
Angelica Jones (born 1983)
Angelica Panganiban (born 1986)
Angelika Dela Cruz (born 1981)
Angeline Quinto (born 1989)
Angelu de Leon (born 1979)
Anita Linda (1924–2020)
Anja Aguilar (born 1994)
Ann Li (born 1995)
Anna Fegi (born 1977)
Anna Marie Gutierrez
Anna Larrucea (born 1984)
Anna Luna (born 1993)
Annabelle Huggins (born 1943)
Annabelle Rama (born 1952)
Anne Curtis (born 1985)
Antoinette Taus (born 1981)
Ar-Angel Aviles (born 2003)
Ara Mina (born 1979)
Arci Muñoz (born 1989)
Ariana Barouk
Aria Clemente (born 1995)
Arianne Bautista (born 1993)
Ariella Arida (born 1988)
Aring Bautista (1920–?)
Armida Siguion-Reyna (1930–2019)
Arny Ross (born 1991)
Arra San Agustin (born 1995)
Aruray (1920–1988)
Ash Ortega (born 1998)
Asia Agcaoili (born 1977)
Assunta de Rossi (born 1981)
Atang dela Rama (1903–1991)
Athena (born 1988)
Aubrey Miles (born 1978)
Aurora Sevilla
Ayanna Oliva (born 1986)
Ayen Munji-Laurel (born 1971)
Ayra Mariano (born 1998)

B

Bamba (born 1979)
Bangs Garcia (born 1987)
Barbara Miguel (born 2004)
Barbara Perez (born 1938)
Barbie Almalbis (born 1977)
Barbie Forteza (born 1997)
Barbie Imperial (born 1998)
Bea Alonzo (born 1987)
Bea Binene (born 1997)
Bea Nicolas (born 1994)
Bea Rose Santiago (born 1990)
Bea Saw (born 1985)
Beatrice Gomez (born 1995)
Beauty Gonzalez (born 1991)
Bela Padilla (born 1991)
Bella Flores (1929–2013)
Belle Mariano (born 2002)
Bettina Carlos (born 1987)
Beverly Vergel (born 1964)
Bianca Gonzalez (born 1983)
Bianca King (born 1985)
Bianca Manalo (born 1987)
Bianca Umali (born 2000)
Bing Loyzaga (born 1970)
Bituin Escalante (born 1977)
Boots Anson-Roa (born 1945)
Brenna Garcia (born 2004)
Bubbles Paraiso (born 1988)

C

Camille Prats (born 1985)
Candy Pangilinan (born 1972)
Caridad Sanchez (born 1936)
Carina Afable (born 1942)
Carla Abellana (born 1986)
Carla Humphries (born 1988)
Carlene Aguilar (born 1982)
Carmen Rosales (1916–1991)
Carmencita Abad (born 1933)
Carmi Martin (born 1963)
Carmina Villarroel (born 1975)
Carol Banawa (born 1981)
Cassandra Ponti (born 1982)
Catriona Gray (born 1994)
Celeste Cortesi (born 1997)
Celeste Legazpi (born 1950)
Celia Rodriguez (born 1934)
Ces Quesada (born 1958)
Chacha Cañete (born 2004)
Chanda Romero (born 1954)
Charee Pineda (born 1990)
Charito de Leon (born 1939)
Charito Solis (1933–1998)
Chariz Solomon (born 1989)
Charlene Gonzales (born 1974)
Charlie Dizon (born 1996)
Charo Santos (born 1955)
Chat Silayan (1959–2006)
Cherie Gil (1963–2022)
Cherry Lou (born 1982)
Cherry Pie Picache (born 1970)
Cheska Garcia (born 1980)
Chichay (1918–1993)
Chin Chin Gutierrez (born 1969)
Chlaui Malayao (born 2008)
Christine Jacob (born 1967)
Chx Alcala (born 1981)
Chynna Ortaleza (born 1982)
Ciara Sotto (born 1980)
Cielito del Mundo (1935–2016)
Cindy Kurleto (born 1981)
Claire dela Fuente (1958–2021)
Claudia Zobel (1965–1984)
Claudine Barretto (born 1979)
Coleen Garcia (born 1992)
Coleen Perez (born 1995)
Coney Reyes (born 1953)
Cris Villonco (born 1983)
Cristina Aragon (born 1932)
Cristina Gonzales (born 1970)
Cristine Reyes (born 1989)
Criza Taa (born 2004)
Cynthia Zamora (born 1938)

D

Daiana Menezes (born 1987)
Daisy Reyes
Daisy Romualdez
Danita Paner (born 1989)
Dasuri Choi (born 1988)
Dawn Zulueta (born 1969)
Delia Razon (born 1931)
Dely Atay-Atayan (1914–2004)
Denise Barbacena (born 1994)
Denise Joaquin
Denise Laurel (born 1987)
Desiree del Valle (born 1982)
Devon Seron (born 1987)
Dexter Doria (born 1955)
Diana Zubiri (born 1985)
Diane Querrer (born 1990)
Diane dela Fuente (born 1981)
Diane Medina (born 1986)
Didith Reyes (1949–2008)
Dimples Cooper (1914–1960) 
Dimples Romana (born 1984)
Dina Bonnevie (born 1961)
Dionne Monsanto (born 1985)
Diva Montelaba (born 1991)
Donita Nose (born 1979)
Donita Rose (born 1974)
Donna Cruz (born 1977)
Dulce (born 1961)

E

Eda Nolan (born 1988)
Elaine Duran (born 1998)
Elha Nympha (born 2004)
Elijah Alejo (born 2004)
Elise Estrada (born 1987)
Elisse Joson (born 1996)
Eliza Pineda (born 1995)
Elizabeth Cooper (1914–1960)
Elizabeth Oropesa (born 1954)
Elizabeth Ramsey (1931–2015)
Ella Cruz (born 1996)
Ella Guevara (born 1998)
Elle Ramirez (born 1991)
Ellen Adarna (born 1988)
Emma Alegre (born 1935)
Emma Henry (?–1986)
Emmanuelle Vera (born 1994)
Empress Schuck (born 1993)
Erich Gonzales (born 1990)
Erika Padilla (born 1986)
Erlinda Cortes (1924–2015)
Esang de Torres (born 2007)
Etang Discher (1908–1981)
Ethel Booba (born 1976)
Eugene Domingo (born 1971)
Eula Caballero (born 1995)
Eula Valdez (born 1968)
Eunice Lagusad (born 1998)
Eva Castillo
Eva Darren (born 1943)
Eva Eugenio
Evangeline Pascual (born 1956)

F

Frances Makil-Ignacio (born 1971)
Francine Diaz (born 2004)
Francine Prieto (born 1981)
Frencheska Farr (born 1992)
Franchesca Salcedo (born 2002)
Fretzie Joan Bercede (born 1993)

G

G. Toengi (born 1978)
Gabbi Garcia (born 1998)
Gaby dela Merced (born 1982)
Gazini Ganados (born 1995)
Gee-Ann Abrahan (born 1985)
Gelli de Belen (born 1973)
Gem Ramos (born 1985)
Geneva Cruz (born 1976)
Georgina Wilson (born 1986)
Gigi de Lana (born 1995)
Gina Alajar (born 1959)
Gina Pareño (born 1949)
Gladys Guevarra (born 1977)
Gladys Reyes (born 1978)
Glaiza de Castro (born 1988)
Glaiza Herradura (born 1978)
Gloria Diaz (born 1951)
Gloria Romero (born 1933)
Gloria Sevilla (1932–2022)
Glydel Mercado (born 1975)
Grace Lee (born 1982)
Gretchen Espina (born 1988)
Gretchen Barretto (born 1970)
Gwen Garci (born 1981)
Gwen Zamora (born 1990)
Gwendoline Ruais (born 1989)

H

Halina Perez (1981–2004)
Helen Vela (1946–1992)
Harlene Bautista
Hazel Ann Mendoza (born 1988)
Heart Evangelista (born 1985)
Heaven Peralejo (born 1999)
Helen Gamboa (born 1948)
Helen Vela (1946–1992)
Helga Krapf (born 1988)
Herlene Budol (born 1999)
Hilda Koronel (born 1957)
Hiyasmin Neri (born 1988)

I

Ian Galliguez (born 1975)
Ice Seguerra (born 1983)
Imee Marcos (born 1955)
Imelda Papin (born 1956)
Imelda Schweighart (born 1995)
Ina Feleo (born 1986)
Ina Raymundo (born 1975)
Inday Badiday (1944–2003)
Ingrid dela Paz (born 1994)
Irma Adlawan (born 1962)
Isabel Blaesi (born 1990)
Isabel Granada (1976–2017)
Isabel Rivas  (born 1958)
Isabel Oli (born 1981)
Isabella de Leon (born 1994)
Isabelle Daza (born 1988)
Ivana Alawi (born 1996)
Iwa Moto (born 1988)
Iya Villania (born 1986)
Iza Calzado (born 1982)

J

Jackie Lou Blanco (born 1964)
Jackie Gonzaga (born 1994)
Jackie Rice (born 1990)
Jaclyn Jose (born 1964)
Jade Ecleo (born 1970)
Jade Lopez (born 1987)
Jamie Rivera (born 1966)
Jan Marini (born 1978)
Jana Roxas (born 1990)
Jane De Leon (born 1998)
Jane Oineza (born 1996)
Janella Salvador (born 1998)
Janelle Jamer (born 1983)
Janelle Quintana (born 1989)
Janette McBride (born 1983)
Janice de Belen (born 1968)
Janina San Miguel (born 1990)
Janine Berdin (born 2002)
Janine Gutierrez (born 1989)
Janine Tugonon (born 1989)
Janna Dominguez (born 1990)
January Isaac (born 1976)
Jasmine Curtis-Smith (born 1994)
Jaya Ramsey (born 1969)
Jaymee Joaquin (born 1979)
Jazz Ocampo (born 1997)
Jean Garcia (born 1969)
Jed Montero (born 1988)
Jef Gaitan (born 1989)
Jennica Garcia (born 1989)
Jennifer Sevilla (born 1974)
Jenny Miller (born 1980)
Jennylyn Mercado (born 1987)
Jessa Zaragoza (born 1978)
Jessy Mendiola (born 1992)
Jewel Mische (born 1990)
Jhoana Marie Tan (born 1993)
Jillian Ward (born 2005)
Jinri Park (born 1988)
Jo Berry (born 1994)
Joanne Quintas (born 1976)
Jocelyn Oxlade (born 1984)
Jodi Sta. Maria (born 1982)
Jolina Magdangal (born 1978)
Jonalyn Viray (born 1989)
Jopay Paguia (born 1983)
Joyce Ching (born 1995)
Joyce Jimenez (born 1978)
Joy Viado (1959–2016)
Juanita Angeles (born 1990)
Judy Ann Santos (born 1978)
Julia Barretto (born 1997)
Julia Clarete (born 1979)
Julia Montes (born 1995)
Julie Anne San Jose (born 1994)
Julie Vega (1968–1985)
Justina David (1912–?)
Juvy Cachola  (born 1956)

K

K Brosas (born 1975)
Kakai Bautista (born 1978)
Kaori Oinuma (born 2000)
Karel Marquez (born 1986)
Karen delos Reyes (born 1984)
Karen Reyes (born 1996)
Karla Estrada (born 1976)
Karylle (born 1981)
Kat Alano (born 1985)
Kate Valdez (born 2000)
Kathleen Hermosa (born 1993)
Kathryn Bernardo (born 1996)
Katrina Halili  (born 1986)
Katy de la Cruz (1907–2004)
Katya Santos (born 1982)
Kaye Abad (born 1982)
 Kazel Kinouchi (born 1991)
KC Concepcion (born 1985)
Keanna Reeves (born 1967)
Kiara Takahashi (born 1997)
Kim Chiu (born 1990)
Kim Domingo (born 1995)
Kim Molina (born 1991)
Kim Rodriguez (born 1994)
Kiray (born 1995)
Kisses Delavin (born 1999)
Kitchie Nadal (born 1980)
Kitkat (born 1984)
Klaudia Koronel (born 1975)
Koreen Medina (born 1995)
Kris Aquino (born 1971)
Kris Bernal (born 1989)
Krista K
Krista Ranillo (born 1984)
Kristel Fulgar (born 1994)
Kristel Moreno (born 1991)
Kristina Paner (born 1971)
Kristine Hermosa (born 1983)
Krizza Neri (born 1995)
Krystal Reyes (born 1996)
Kuh Ledesma (born 1955)
Kylie Padilla (born 1993)
Kylie Verzosa (born 1992)
Kyline Alcantara (born 2002)
KZ Tandingan (born 1992)

L

Lady Lee (born 1986)
Lana Jalosjos
Lani Mercado (born 1968)
Lani Misalucha (born 1969)
Lauren Young (born 1993)
Laurice Guillen (born 1947)
Lea Salonga (born 1971)
Leanne Bautista (born 2010)
Letty Alonzo (born 1932)
Lexi Fernandez (born 1995)
Lie Reposposa (born 2003)
Liezel Lopez (born 1997)
Liezl Martinez (1967–2015)
Lilet (born 1977)
Lilia Cuntapay (1935–2016)
Lilia Dizon (1928–2020)
Lilian Velez (1924–1948)
Linda Estrella (1926–2012)
Lindsay Custodio (born 1978)
Liz Alindogan (born 1963)
Liza Diño (born 1981)
Liza Lorena (born 1948)
Liza Soberano (born 1998)
LJ Reyes (born 1987)
Loisa Andalio (born 1999)
Lolit Solis (born 1947)
Lolita Rodriguez (1935–2016)
Lorna Tolentino (born 1961)
Lorraine Schuck 
Lota Delgado (1918–2009)
Lotlot de Leon (born 1971)
Lougee Basabas (born 1984)
Louise Abuel (born 2003)
Louise delos Reyes (born 1993)
Lovely Abella (born 1985)
Lovely Rivero (born 1969)
Lovi Poe (born 1989)
Luane Dy (born 1986)
Lucita Soriano (1941–2015)
Lucy Torres (born 1974)
Luz Valdez (born 1940)
Lyca Gairanod (born 2004)

M

Madam Auring (1940–2020)
Mahal (1974–2021)
Maey Bautista (born 1972)
Maika Rivera (born 1995)
Maine Mendoza (born 1995)
Maja Salvador (born 1988)
Malou de Guzman (born 1958)
Manilyn Reynes (born 1972)
Mara Lopez (born 1991)
Margaret Nales Wilson (born 1989)
Margie Moran (born 1953)
Maria Amapola Cabase (born 1948)
Maria Isabel Lopez (born 1957)
Maria Teresa Carlson (1963–2001)
Marian Rivera (born 1984)
Marianne dela Riva
Maricar de Mesa (born 1980)
Maricar Reyes (born 1984)
Maricel Laxa (born 1970)
Maricel Soriano (born 1965)
Maricris Garcia (born 1987)
Mariel Pamintuan (born 1998)
Mariel Rodriguez (born 1984)
Marife Necesito (born 1980)
Marion Aunor (born 1992)
Maris Racal (born 1997)
Marissa Delgado (born 1951)
Marita Zobel (born 1941)
Maritoni Fernandez (born 1969)
Mariz Ricketts
Marjorie Barretto (born 1974)
Marla Boyd (born 1987)
Marlann Flores (born 1993)
Marlene Dauden (born 1941)
Marvelous Alejo (born 1996)
Mary Walter (1912–1993)
Mary Jean Lastimosa (born 1987)
Matet de Leon (born 1982)
Matimtiman Cruz (1919–1992)
Maui Taylor (born 1981)
Maureen Francisco
Maureen Larrazabal (born 1979)
Maureen Wroblewitz (born 1998)
Max Collins (born 1992)
Max Eigenmann (born 1987)
Maxine Medina (born 1990)
Maxene Magalona (born 1986)
Maybelyn dela Cruz (born 1982)
Maymay Entrata (born 1997)
Mayton Eugenio (born 1987)
Meg Imperial (born 1993)
Megan Young (born 1990)
Melai Cantiveros (born 1988)
Melanie Marquez (born 1964)
Melissa Mendez (born 1964)
Melissa Ricks (born 1990)
Mely Tagasa (1935–2018)
Mercedes Cabral (born 1986)
Metring David (1920–2010)
Mich Dulce (born 1981)
Michelle Madrigal (born 1987)
Michelle van Eimeren (born 1972)
Michelle Vergara Moore (born 1989)
Mickey Ferriols (born 1973)
Miho Nishida (born 1992)
Mika Dela Cruz (born 1998) 
Mikee Cojuangco-Jaworski (born 1974)
Mikee Lee (born 1990)
Mikee Quintos (born 1997)
Mila del Sol (1923–2020)
Miles Ocampo (born 1997)
Mimiyuuuh (born 1996)
Miriam Quiambao (born 1975)
Moira Dela Torre (born 1993)
Mona Lisa (1922–2019)
Mona Louise Rey (born 2004)
Monang Carvajal (born 1898)
Morissette (born 1996)
Mosang (born 1972)
Mutya Datul (born 1992)
Mutya Orquia (born 2006)
Mylene Dizon (born  1976)
Myrtle Sarrosa (born 1994)

N

Nadine Lustre (born 1993)
Nadine Samonte (born 1988)
Nancy Castiglione (born 1981)
Nanette Medved (born 1971)
Nathalie Hart (born 1992)
Naty Bernardo (1911–1987)
Nela Alvarez (1919–2009)
Nena Cardenas
Nene Tamayo (born 1981)
Neri Naig (born 1983)
Nicole Dulalia (born 1997)
Nicole Uysiuseng (born 1990)
Nida Blanca (1936–2001)
Nikka Valencia
Nikki Bacolod (born 1989)
Nikki Gil (born 1987)
Nikki Valdez (born 1979)
Nikki Samonte (born 2000)
Nina Girado (born 1980)
Nina Kodaka (born 1989)
Niña Dolino (born 1982)
Niña Jose (born 1988)
Nora Aunor (born 1953)
Nori Dalisay (born 1938)
Nova Villa (born 1947)

O

Olivia Cenizal (1926–2008)

P

Pacita del Rio (1921–1989)
Paraluman (1923–2009)
Patricia Fernandez (born 1985)
Patricia Tumulak (born 1988)
Paula Peralejo (born 1984)
Pauleen Luna (born 1988)
Pauline Mendoza (born 1999)
Paw Diaz (born 1987)
Perla Bautista (born 1940)
Phoemela Barranda (born 1980)
Pia Guanio (born 1974)
Pia Moran
Pia Wurtzbach (born 1989)
Pilar Pilapil (born 1950)
Pilita Corrales (born 1939)
Pinky Amador (born 1966)
Pokwang (born 1973)
Pops Fernandez (born 1966)
Precious Lara Quigaman (born 1983)
Princess Guevarra (born 1999)
Princess Punzalan (born 1963)
Princess Ryan (born 1989)

Q
Queneerich Rehman (born 1992)

R

Rabiya Mateo (born 1996)
Rachel Alejandro (born 1974)
Rachel Peters (born 1991)
Rachelle Ann Go (born 1986)
Radha Cuadrado (born 1976)
Raquel Monteza (born 1955)
Raven Villanueva (born 1976)
Rebecca del Rio (1929–2010)
Rebecca Lusterio (born 1989)
Regine Angeles (born 1985)
Regine Tolentino (born 1980)
Regine Velasquez (born 1970)
Rhian Ramos (born 1990)
Ria Atayde (born 1992)
Rica Peralejo (born 1981)
Rich Asuncion (born 1989)
Rio Diaz (1959–2004)
Rio Locsin (born 1969)
Rita Avila (born 1968)
Rita Daniela (born 1995)
Ritz Azul (born 1994)
Riza Santos (born 1987)
Rochelle Pangilinan (born 1982)
Rosa Aguirre (1908–1981)
Rosa del Rosario (1917–2006)
Rosa Mia (1925–2006)
Rosa Rosal (born 1931)
Rose Ann Gonzales
Roselle Nava (born 1976)
Rosemarie Gil (born 1942)
Rosemarie Sonora (born 1948)
Rox Montealegre (born 1990)
Roxanne Barcelo (born 1985)
Roxanne Guinoo (born 1986)
RR Enriquez (born 1985)
Ruby Moreno (born 1965)
Ruby Rodriguez (born 1966)
Rufa Mae Quinto (born 1978)
Rufa Mi (born 1988)
Ruffa Gutierrez (born 1974)
Ryza Cenon (born 1987)
Ryzza Mae Dizon (born 2005)

S

Saab Magalona (born 1988)
Sabrina Man (born 2000)
Sam Bumatay (born 1999)
Sam Pinto (born 1989)
Sandara Park (born 1984)
Sandy Andolong (born 1959)
Sandy Talag (born 1998)
Sanya Lopez (born 1996)
Sarah Christophers (born 1986)
Sarah Geronimo (born 1988)
Sarah Lahbati (born 1993)
Sarita Pérez de Tagle (born 1986)
Say Alonzo (born 1983)
Scarlet Garcia (1985–2008)
Serena Dalrymple (born 1990)
Shaina Magdayao (born 1989)
Shaira Diaz (born 1995)
Shamaine Buencamino (born 1965)
Shamcey Supsup (born 1986)
Sharlene San Pedro (born 1999)
Sharmaine Arnaiz (born 1974)
Sharon Cuneta (born 1966)
Sheena Halili (born 1987)
Sheree Bautista (born 1986)
Sherilyn Reyes-Tan (born 1975)
Shermaine Santiago (born 1980)
Sheryl Cruz (born 1974)
Sheryn Regis (born 1980)
Shey Bustamante (born 1993)
Shine Kuk (born 1992)
Shy Carlos (born 1995)
Snooky Serna (born 1966)
Sofie Garrucho
Solenn Heussaff (born 1985)
Sofia Andres (born 1998)
Sofia Moran (born 1945)
Sophia Montecarlo (born 1986)
Sophie Albert (born 1990)
Stella Ruiz White (born 1975)
Stef Prescott (born 1991)
Stephanie Sol (born 1990)
Sue Prado
Sue Ramirez (born 1996)
Sugar Mercado (born 1986)
Sunshine Cruz (born 1977)
Sunshine Dizon (born 1983)
Susan Africa (born 1959)
Susan Roces  (1941–2022)
Suzette Ranillo (born 1961)
Sylvia La Torre (1933–2022)
Sylvia Sanchez (born 1971)

T

Taki Saito (born 2000)
Tanya Garcia (born 1981)
Tessie Agana (born 1943)
Tessie Tomas (born 1950)
Tetchie Agbayani (born 1961)
Thea Tolentino (born 1996)
Therese Malvar (born 2000)
Tippy Dos Santos (born 1994)
Tita de Villa (1931–2014)
Tita Duran (1929–1991)
Tita Muñoz (1927–2009)
Tiya Pusit (1948–2014)
Toni Gonzaga (born 1984)
Toni Rose Gayda (born 1958)
Tootsie Guevara (born 1980)
Tuesday Vargas (born 1979)

V

Valeen Montenegro (born 1990)
Valerie Concepcion (born 1987)
Valerie Weigmann (born 1989)
Vaness del Moral (born 1988)
Venus Raj (born 1988)
Verna Gaston (1950–2005)
Vicki Belo (born 1956)
Vickie Rushton (born 1992)
Vilma Santos (born 1953)
Vina Morales (born 1975)
Vivian Velez (born 1968)      
Vivoree Esclito (born 2000)

W

Wendy Valdez (born 1982)
Whitney Tyson
Wynwyn Marquez (born 1992)

X

Xia Vigor (born 2009)
Xyriel Manabat (born 2004)

Y

Yam Concepcion (born 1989)
Yasmien Kurdi (born 1989)
Yassi Pressman (born 1995)
Yayo Aguila (born 1967)
Yen Santos (born 1992)
Yeng Constantino (born 1988)
Yesha Camile (born 2009)
Ylona Garcia (born 2002)
Ynna Asistio (born 1991)
Ysabel Ortega (born 1999)

Z

Zandra Summer (born 1994)
Zeny Zabala (1934–2017)
Zephanie Dimaranan (born 2003)
Zeryl Lim (born 1987)
Zia Marquez (born 1992)
Zia Quizon (born 1991)
Zorayda Sanchez (1951–2008)
Zsa Zsa Padilla (born 1964)

See also
 List of current child actors from the Philippines
 List of former child actors from the Philippines

Actresses
Filipina actresses
Filipino
actresses